Paris Cooperative High School is located in Paris, Illinois. The school mascot is the tiger and its colors are orange and black.

On July 1, 2009, the renamed Paris Cooperative High School (formerly Paris High School) became the first cooperative high school in the state of Illinois. Paris High School is accredited by the North Central Association Commission on Accreditation and School Improvement (NCA CASI), and accreditation division of AdvancED.

History
The first public high school in Paris opened in 1869. The high school shared a building with one of the city's grade schools until 1909, when the city built a dedicated high school building. Architect Arthur L. Pillsbury of Bloomington designed the building in the Classical Revival style; his design included a two-story portico at the main entrance, stone and terra cotta arched doorways, quoins at the corners, and a dentillated cornice. The school's sports teams saw statewide success in the late 1930s, and as a result, the city built a new gymnasium for the school. Architects Berger and Kelley of Champaign designed the gym in the Streamline Moderne style. The gym was dedicated to longtime school basketball coach Ernie Eveland, who led the team to its early successes, in 1940.

The high school celebrated its 100-year anniversary in 2009. On May 29, 2015, Paris Cooperative High School left its original building for a new location. The original building was listed on the National Register of Historic Places on April 16, 2019.

Notable students
John Honnold (1915-2011), law professor at the University of Pennsylvania Law School
Brett Eldredge, country music recording artist
Tom Sunkel, baseball pitcher for the St. Louis Cardinals, New York Giants, and Brooklyn Dodgers

References

External links
 Official web site

Schools in Edgar County, Illinois
Public high schools in Illinois
National Register of Historic Places in Edgar County, Illinois
School buildings completed in 1909
Neoclassical architecture in Illinois
Streamline Moderne architecture in Illinois
1909 establishments in Illinois